The Scranton Railway Company built and operated electric trolleys in and around Scranton, Pennsylvania, from 1896 until 1954. 

The company was formed to consolidate various trolley companies in Scranton and Lackawanna County. At its peak, the company had city lines in Scranton and Dunmore and suburban lines north to Forest City and south to Duryea and Pittston. Its last trolley ran in 1954.

History 

In 1900, it carried 10.5 million passengers.

In 1902, it operated more than 100 cars.

In 1905, the railway was purchased by American Railways Company, a holding company that also owned the Altoona and Logan Valley Electric Railway, the People's Railway, the Springfield Railway Company, and other electric railways.

In 1907, the railway owned 47.63 miles of track, and operated over 81.55 miles of track.

In 1910, it operated five steam locomotives.

In 1912, it carried 24 million passengers. A promotional book produced by the city's Board of Trade touted the "Gateway to the Clouds", a 12-mile, 54-minute ride from downtown Scranton that rose 1,200 feet to the resort area of Lake Moosic. This route traveled over the leased Scranton, Dunmore, and Moosic Lake Railroad.

In the 1920s, ridership began to decline. Long suburban lines were cut back as buses began to appear. In 1923, the Scranton Railway Company asked for and received approval from the local Public Service Commission to abandon its service from Scranton to Pittston. In 1925, it abandoned service from Old Forge to Duryea, where there was a connection to Wilkes-Barre.  

From 1925-28, the company was owned by National Public Service Corporation, which was soon taken over by Chicago businessman Samuel Insull's Middle West Utilities Co. Insull's Chicago-based business empire collapsed in 1932, whereupon the company passed to the Municipal Service Co. In 1934, the Scranton Railway was reorganized as Scranton Transit Company.

Its last trolley car ran in 1954, its lines replaced by buses.

Scranton Transit ceased all bus operations on Nov. 15, 1971. It was succeeded in 1972 by the County of Lackawanna Transit System.

Footnotes

References
 

Scranton, Pennsylvania
Defunct Pennsylvania railroads
Interurban railways in Pennsylvania
Railway companies established in 1896
Railway companies disestablished in 1954
1896 establishments in Pennsylvania
American companies established in 1896
1954 disestablishments in Pennsylvania
American companies disestablished in 1954